

Player awards (NBA)

Regular Season MVP 

 Magic Johnson, Los Angeles Lakers

NBA Finals MVP 

 Magic Johnson, Los Angeles Lakers

Slam Dunk Contest 

 Michael Jordan, Chicago Bulls

Three-point Shootout 

 Larry Bird, Boston Celtics

Collegiate awards
 Men
John R. Wooden Award: David Robinson, Navy
Naismith College Coach of the Year: Bob Knight, Indiana
Frances Pomeroy Naismith Award: Muggsy Bogues, Wake Forest
Associated Press College Basketball Player of the Year: David Robinson, Navy
NCAA basketball tournament Most Outstanding Player: Danny Manning, Kansas
Associated Press College Basketball Coach of the Year: Tom Davis, Iowa
Naismith Outstanding Contribution to Basketball: Pete Newell
 Women
Naismith College Player of the Year: Clarissa Davis, Texas
Naismith College Coach of the Year: Pat Summitt, Tennessee
Wade Trophy: Shelly Pennefather, Villanova
Frances Pomeroy Naismith Award: Rhonda Windham, USC
NCAA basketball tournament Most Outstanding Player: Tonya Edwards, Tennessee
Carol Eckman Award: Jody Conradt, Texas

Naismith Memorial Basketball Hall of Fame
Class of 1987:
Rick Barry
Walt Frazier
Bob Houbregs
Pete Maravich
Bobby Wanzer

Deaths
April 7 — Pick Dehner, American NBL player (Hammond Ciesar All-Americans), college All-American (Illinois) and high school coach (born 1914)
April 15 — Press Maravich, American college and professional player and coach (born 1915)
May 7 — Phil Woolpert, American Hall of Fame college coach (San Francisco) (born 1915)
June 5 — Joe Bradley, American NBA player (Chicago Stags) (born 1928)
June 13 — Johnny High, American NBA player (Phoenix Suns) (born 1957)
August 16 — Nick Vanos, American NBA player (Phoenix Suns) (born 1963)

See also
 1987 in sports

References